William White Clark (September 23, 1819 – August 6, 1883) was a prominent Confederate politician. He was born in Richmond County, Georgia and served in the Georgia state legislature in 1841. He represented the state in the First Confederate Congress from 1862 to 1864.

External links

1819 births
1883 deaths
Members of the Confederate House of Representatives from Georgia (U.S. state)
19th-century American politicians